Small Media, Big Revolution: Communication, Culture, and the Iranian Revolution is a book by Annabelle Sreberny-Mohammadi and Ali Mohammadi. First published by the University of Minnesota Press in 1994, it deals with how small media (leaflets and audio cassettes) played an important role in the revolution that deposed the Shah of Iran.

References

External links
 Small Media, Big Revolution: Communication, Culture, and the Iranian Revolution 
 Professor Annabelle Sreberny 

Books about the Iranian Revolution